Kalutara Physical Culture Centre was a first class cricket team in Sri Lanka which featured in the Saravanamuttu Trophy competition of 1991-92 and the 2016–17 Premier League Tournament Tier B.

List of players
The following is a list of players of the Kalutara Physical Culture Centre team.
RW Chandrasiri
B. David
S. Devapriya
Mahesh Hemantha
Louis Karunaratne
K. Mendis
P. Peiris
T. Silva

See also
 List of Sri Lankan cricket teams

References

External links
 Kalutara Physical Culture Centre at CricketArchive

Former senior cricket clubs of Sri Lanka